This is a list of AM radio stations in the United States having call signs beginning with the letters KT to KZ.

KT--

KU--

KV--

KW--

KX--

KY--

KZ--

See also
 North American call sign

AM radio stations in the United States by call sign (initial letters KT-KZ)